Shri  Ongden Tshering  Lepcha a politician from Sikkim Democratic Front party is a former Member of the Parliament of India representing Sikkim in the Rajya Sabha, the upper house of the Parliament during 2006-2012.

External links
 Profile on Rajya Sabha website

References

Year of birth missing (living people)
Sikkim Democratic Front politicians
Lepcha people
Rajya Sabha members from Sikkim
Living people
Sikkim politicians